Winnie Mashaba is a  South African gospel singer, TV presenter, and businesswoman. Born and raised in the small village of Kgoši Phasha, Steelpoort, released her first album Exodus 20 in 2000.

Early life
Winnie Mashaba went to school at Mashupje High School but dropped out soon after passing Grade 11 in 1998 to pursue her passion for gospel music. Her first break came right after she auditioned for Solly Moholo. Soon after the audition, she released her debut album, Exodus 20 released in 2000. She has been nominated for numerous awards, including a Kora for Best African Spiritual Female in 2005. Other awards include the South African Music Awards (SAMA), South African Gospel Awards and Metro FM Music Awards. In 2010 she was named Best Female Artist at the Crown Gospel Awards.
She landed a TV presenting role Amahubo on Dumisa in 2015.

In November 2019, she received an Honorary Doctorate from Trinity International Bible University (TIBU) for her work in music.

Discography
2000: Exodus 20
2007: Kea Letshaba Lefase
2007:Ditebogo
2008: Ke Rata Wena
2003: Motswelle Se Bapale Ka Kekere
2001: Lefu Le Tshabeng Ellish Park Stadium
2003: Motswelle Se Bapale Ka Kereke Ena
2009: Joang Kapa Joang
2006: Thola ngwanesu
2010: Go Tseba Jehova
2011: Modimo O Nale Nna
2012: Bophelo Ke Leeto
2014: Very Best Of (Live)
2015: Lehlotlo Laka
2005: O Tla Ya Kae?
2016: 1st Hymns Project Live Recorded
2017: Dilo Tša Lefase
2018: The Journey With Winnie Mashaba Live at Emperors Palace
2021: Moporofeta Jeremiah

Awards

Limpopo Music Awards  

!
|-
|2019
|
|Best Traditional Gospel Artist
|
|

References

External links
  
 Kellman - The Big Interview with Winnie Mashaba
 

1981 births
Living people
People from Limpopo
People from Sekhukhune District Municipality